Cher Korver (born 11 August 1976) is a Dutch wheelchair basketball player (2.5 disability class) and a member of the Netherlands women's national wheelchair basketball team. With the national team she competed at 6 consecutive Summer Paralympics between 2000 and 2020. She won with the team the gold medal at the 2020 Summer Paralympics, and the bronze medal at the 2012 Summer Paralympics and 2016 Summer Paralympics. She became world champion in 2018 and European champion in 2017 and 2019.

Life 
Korver was born in Amersfoort on 11 August 1976. She has impaired muscle power in her legs since she is 19 years old. started with playing wheelchair basketball in 1997. She made her debut for the national team in 1998 Wheelchair Basketball World Championship. She competed at the 2008 Paralympic World Cup.

She was awarded the Rob Verheuvel Award for her contribution to wheelchair basketball in 2014. She lives in Nijkerk.

References

External links 
 Cher Korver, Holland News Photo - Getty Images

1976 births
Living people
Dutch women's wheelchair basketball players
Sportspeople from Amersfoort
Paralympic wheelchair basketball players of the Netherlands
Paralympic gold medalists for the Netherlands
Paralympic bronze medalists for the Netherlands
Paralympic medalists in wheelchair basketball
Wheelchair basketball players at the 2020 Summer Paralympics
Medalists at the 2020 Summer Paralympics
Wheelchair basketball players at the 2016 Summer Paralympics
Medalists at the 2016 Summer Paralympics
Wheelchair basketball players at the 2012 Summer Paralympics
Medalists at the 2012 Summer Paralympics
Wheelchair basketball players at the 2008 Summer Paralympics
Wheelchair basketball players at the 2004 Summer Paralympics
Wheelchair basketball players at the 2000 Summer Paralympics
21st-century Dutch women